Ainslie Park is a football stadium located in Edinburgh, Scotland, which is the home ground of Lowland Football League club Spartans and the club's women's team in the Scottish Women's Premier League (SWPL). In addition, Scottish Professional Football League club Edinburgh City have shared the ground since 2017 during the redevelopment of Meadowbank Stadium, and East of Scotland Football League club Lothian Thistle Hutchison Vale also played there during the 2021–22 season. Another SWPL team, Hibernian, also previously played there from 2016 to 2021.

History
Spartans F.C. had previously played at City Park, in the Crewe Toll area of Edinburgh, until moving to Ainslie Park in November 2008.

In March 2017, Edinburgh City reached an agreement with Spartans to use Ainslie Park for three seasons while Meadowbank Stadium is being redeveloped. Edinburgh City announced they would return to Meadowbank in 2021, but this was delayed by ongoing works, and they stayed at Ainslie Park for the 2021–22 season.

Hibernian Women played at the stadium for several seasons until 2021, when they relocated to Almondvale Stadium in Livingston, West Lothian.

East of Scotland Football League club Lothian Thistle Hutchison Vale moved all their men's first team matches to Ainslie Park for the 2021–22 season, due to problems with the pitch at their Saughton Enclosure ground.

Facilities
Ainslie Park on Pilton Drive in north Edinburgh is the home ground of Spartans, part of their Community Football Academy. The new facility incorporates a fully enclosed stadium which meets SFA and SFL criteria, with an artificial pitch, floodlights, seating for 504 spectators and an overall capacity of 3,000. Another full size, floodlit artificial pitch sits adjacent to the main playing area and the accommodation incorporates six changing rooms, a club room, committee room and a physio room. The Club ground holds a PA system and a bar for spectators.

Transport

The nearby Ferry Road is served by Lothian Buses route numbers 21 and 27. Services 19, 29, 37 & 47 also run within  of the stadium.

References

Football venues in Edinburgh
Spartans F.C.
F.C. Edinburgh
Sports venues in Edinburgh
Lowland Football League venues
Scottish Professional Football League venues
Hibernian W.F.C.
Scottish Women's Premier League venues
Lothian Thistle Hutchison Vale F.C.